National Voluntary Laboratory Accreditation Program (NVLAP) is a National Institute of Standards and Technology (NIST) program in the USA which provides an unbiased third-party test and evaluation program to accredit laboratories in their respective fields to the ISO 17025 standard. NVLAP is in compliance with ISO 17011.

Accredited laboratories

Calibration
Dimensional
Electromagnetics - DC low frequency
Electromagnetics - RF/microwave
Ionizing radiation
Mechanical
Optical radiation
Thermodynamic
Time and frequency

Chemical calibration
Chemical calibration: providers of proficiency testing
Chemical calibration: certifiers of spectrophotometric NTRMs

Dosimetry
Ionizing radiation dosimetry
Reverse osmosis with applied heat during deionization.

Electromagnetic compatibility and telecommunications

Environmental
Asbestos fiber analysis (PLM test method)
Asbestos fiber analysis (TEM test method)

Fasteners and metals
Fasteners and metals program

Information technology security
Common Criteria Testing Laboratory (CCTL)
Cryptographic Module Testing Program (CMTP)

Personal body armor

Product testing
Acoustical testing services
Carpet and carpet cushion
Commercial products testing
Construction materials testing
Efficiency of electric motors
Energy efficient lighting products
Thermal insulation materials
Wood based Products

External links
NIST NVLAP

ISO standards
National Institute of Standards and Technology
Product-testing organizations